Kathleen Murphy (born April 13, 1979), known as Katie Murphy, is an American martial artist.  She is a twenty-two time World Champion in karate, a fifteen-time U.S. National Champion, and a ten-time New York State Champion.

Personal life
Murphy was born and raised in LaGrange, New York.  The second oldest of nine children, she started her martial arts training as a teenager in 1991. She earned her first black belt (Shodan) in USA Gōjū-ryū karate in 1996 (two weeks after her 17th birthday) under Sensei Thomas Maloney and Sensei Joseph Rinaldi.  She was awarded her Fourth degree Black Belt (Yodan) from her instructors in 2010.  She was the Head Instructor of the Unionvale, New York Martial Arts Dojo until it ceased operation in 2014. She earned her Ed.D. degree from Western Connecticut State University in 2014. Dr. Murphy and her husband David Kalish currently live in the Hudson Valley, New York.

She currently trains at the Fighting Spirit Karate Studio  in New Paltz, New York, under Shidoshi Sean Schenker.  Recently, Katie has expanded her martial arts journey, training in Goju-Ryu, Kyokushin, Shotokan, Judo, and Krav Maga.

Career highlights

2014
In 2014, Murphy competed on the following circuits: North American Sport Karate Association (NASKA), World Karate and Kickboxing Council (WKC), and the New York Tournament League (NYT).  She was a sponsored athlete by Team Off The Line.

Tournament Highlights:

2014 North American Sport Karate Association (NASKA) 
 Women's 30-39 Creative Forms Division Ranking – 1st place (World Champion)
 Women's 30-39 Traditional Weapons Division Ranking – 1st place (World Champion)
 Women's 30-39 Traditional Forms Division Ranking – 2nd place (Top Ten)
 Amerikick Internationals Women's 30+ Forms Grand Champion (Philadelphia, PA) (World Champion)
 Ocean States Grand Nationals Women's 30+ Weapons Grand Champion (Warwick, RI)
 Ocean States Grand Nationals Women's 30+ Forms Grand Champion (Warwick, RI)
 New England Open Karate Championship Women's 30+ Weapons Grand Champion (Marlborough, MA)
 New England Open Karate Championship Women's 30+ Forms Grand Champion (Marlborough, MA)
 Twin Towers Classic Karate Championship Women's 30+ Forms Grand Champion (New York, NY)
 Twin Towers Classic Karate Championship Women's 30+ Weapons Grand Champion (New York, NY)

2014 World Karate and Kickboxing Council (WKC)
 WKC World Championships (Dublin, IRE) Gold Medal Winner 18-34 Traditional Forms (World Champion)
 WKC World Championships (Dublin, IRE) Gold Medal Winner 18-34 Creative Forms (World Champion)
 WKC World Championships (Dublin, IRE) Silver Medal Winner 18-34 Traditional Hard Style Weapons
 WKC World Championships (Dublin, IRE) Silver Medal Winner 18+ Classical Forms
 WKC Nationals (Detroit, MI) Gold Medal Winner 18-34 Creative Forms (US National Champion)
 WKC Nationals (Detroit, MI) Gold Medal Winner 18-34 Traditional Hard Style Weapons (US National Champion)
 WKC Nationals (Detroit, MI) Silver Medal Winner 18-34 Traditional Forms

2014 New York Tournament League (NYT) 
 Overall Grand Champion Adult Black Belt Forms
 Overall Grand Champion, Adult Black Belt Weapons
 NYT Nationals – Black Belt Forms Grand Champion (US National Champion)
 New York State Championships – Black Belt Forms Grand Champion (New York State Champion)
 Long Island Summer Open – Black Belt Weapons Grand Champion

2013
In 2013, Murphy competed on the following circuits: North American Sport Karate Association (NASKA), World Karate and Kickboxing Council (WKC), and Karate Ratings Association of New England (KRANE).  She was a sponsored athlete by Team Off The Line.

Tournament Highlights:

2013 North American Sport Karate Association (NASKA) 
 Women's 30+ Overall Forms Grand Champion (World Grand Champion)
 Women's 30+ Overall Weapons Grand Champion (World Grand Champion)
 Women's 30-39 Traditional Forms Division Ranking – 1st place (World Champion)
 Women's 30-39 Creative Forms Division Ranking – 1st place (World Champion)
 Women's 30-39 Traditional Weapons Division Ranking – 1st place (World Champion)
 Amerikick Internationals Women's 30+ Weapons Grand Champion (Philadelphia, PA) (World Champion)
 Amerikick Internationals Women's 30+ Forms Grand Champion (Philadelphia, PA) (World Champion)
 Ocean States Grand Nationals Women's 30+ Weapons Grand Champion (Warwick, RI)
 Ocean States Grand Nationals Women's 30+ Forms Grand Champion (Warwick, RI)
 Quebec City Open Karate Championship Women's 30+ Weapons Grand Champion (Quebec, CA)
 New England Open Karate Championship Women's 30+ Weapons Grand Champion (Marlborough, MA)
 New England Open Karate Championship Women's 30+ Forms Grand Champion (Marlborough, MA)
 Dixieland Nationals Karate Championship Women's 30+ Forms Grand Champion (Myrtle Beach, SC)
 Dixieland Nationals Karate Championship Women's 30+ Weapons Grand Champion (Myrtle Beach, SC)

2013 World Karate and Kickboxing Council (WKC)
 WKC Nationals (Detroit, MI) Gold Medal Winner 18-34 Creative Forms (US National Champion)
 WKC Nationals (Detroit, MI) Gold Medal Winner 18-34 Traditional Hard Style Weapons (US National Champion)
 WKC Nationals (Detroit, MI) Silver Medal Winner 18-34 Traditional Forms
 WKC Regional Qualifier (Brooklyn, NY) Gold Medal Winner 18-34 Traditional Forms
 WKC Regional Qualifier (Brooklyn, NY) Gold Medal Winner 18-34 Creative Forms
 WKC Regional Qualifier (Brooklyn, NY) Gold Medal Winner 18-34 Traditional Hard Style Weapons

2013 Karate Rating Association of New England (KRANE)
 KRANE Nationals Gold Medal Winner 30-39 Women's Traditional Forms (US National Champion)
 KRANE Nationals Gold Medal Winner 30-39 Women's Traditional Weapons (US National Champion)

2012
On January 20, 2012, Murphy was Awarded "2011 Female Competitor of the Year" by Action Martial Arts Magazine.

Murphy is the top ranked Female Forms competitor on the following Karate Circuits: NASKA (North American Sport Karate Association), WKC (World Kickboxing Council), and the US. Martial Arts Games.

Tournament Highlights:

North American Sport Karate Association (NASKA)
 2012 Women's 30-39 Traditional Forms Division Ranking – 1st place  (World Champion)
 2012 Women's 30-39 Creative Forms Division Ranking – 1st place  (World Champion)
 2012 Women's 30-39 Traditional Weapons Division Ranking – 1st  place (World Champion)
 Amerikick Internationals Women's 30+ Weapons Grand Champion (Philadelphia, PA) 
 Amerikick Internationals Women's 30+ Forms Grand Champion (Philadelphia, PA)
 Gator Nationals Women's 30+ Forms Grand Champion (Daytona Beach, FL)
 New England Open Karate Championship Women's 30+ Weapons Grand Champion (Marlborough, MA)
 New England Open Karate Championship Women's 30+ Forms Grand Champion (Marlborough, MA)
 US Open / ISKA World Martial Arts Championships Women's 30+ Forms Grand Champion (Orlando, FL)
 US Capitol Classics / China Open Women's 30+ Forms Grand Champion (Washington, DC)
 Twin Towers Karate Tournament Women's 30+ Forms Grand Champion (New York, NY)
 Twin Towers Karate Tournament Women's 30+ Weapons Grand Champion (New York, NY)
 Pan American Internationals / WKF World Championships Women's 30+ Forms Grand Champion (Miami, FL)

US Martial Arts Games (Bregenz Austria)
 26-35 Women's Black Belt Traditional Weapons – Gold Medalist (World Champion)
 26-35 Women's Black Belt Traditional Forms –Gold Medalist (World Champion)
 26-35 Women's Black Belt Musical Forms – Gold Medalist (World Champion)
 26-35 Women's Black Belt Creative Forms – Gold Medalist (World Champion)

World Karate and Kickboxing Council (WKC)
 2012 WKC United States National Team Member

2012 WKC World Championships (Montreal, Canada) 
 Gold Medalist 18-34 Creative Forms – (World Champion)
 Silver Medalist 18-34 Traditional Forms
 Bronze Medalist 18-34 Traditional Weapons

2012 WKC Nationals (Detroit, Mi)
 Gold Medal Winner 18-34 Traditional Forms (US National Champion)
 Gold Medal Winner 18-34 Creative Forms (US National Champion)
 Silver Medal Winner 18-34 Traditional Hard Style Weapons

2011
At the 2011 World Karate & Kickboxing Council (WKC) World Championships in Cádiz, Spain, Murphy won Gold Medals in Traditional Weapons and Creative Forms.  At the same event, she won three Bronze Medals in Women's Team Point Sparring, Traditional Hard Style Forms, and Creative Weapons.

Tournament Highlights:

US Martial Arts Games (Orlando, FL)
 26-35 Adult Blackbelt Traditional Weapons – Bronze Medalist
 26-35 Adult Blackbelt Creative Weapons – Silver Medalist
 26-35 Adult Black Belt Traditional Forms – Silver Medalist
 26-35 Adult Black Belt Creative Forms – Silver Medalist

2011 World Karate and Kickboxing Council (WKC) World Championships (Cádiz, Spain) 
 Gold Medalist 18-34 Traditional Weapons – (World Champion)
 Gold Medalist 18-34 Creative Forms – (World Champion)
 Bronze Medalist 18-34 Traditional Hard Style Forms
 Bronze Medalists 18-34 Creative Weapons
 Bronze Medalist Women's Team Point Sparring

2011 World Karate and Kickboxing Council (WKC) US Nationals (Detroit, Mi)
 Gold Medal Winner 18-34 Traditional Forms (National Champion)
 Gold Medal Winner 18-34 Creative Forms (National Champion)
 Gold Medal Winner 18-34 Traditional Hard Style Weapons (National Champion)

Karate Rating Association of New England (KRANE)
 2011 KRANE New York State Champion  30-39 Women's Traditional Forms (New York State Champion)
 2011 KRANE New York State Champion  30-39 Women's Traditional Weapons (New York State Champion)
 2011 KRANE Division Champion  30-39 Women's Traditional Forms
 2011 KRANE Division Champion  30-39 Women's Traditional Weapons

North American Sport Karate Association (NASKA)
 2011 Women's 30-39 Traditional Forms Division Ranking – 2nd place Overall
 2011 Women's 30-39 Traditional Weapons Division Ranking – 3rd place Overall
 Amerikick Internationals Women's 30+ Weapons Grand Champion (Philadelphia, PA) 
 Amerikick Internationals Women's 30+ Forms Grand Champion (Philadelphia, PA)
 New England Open Karate Championship Women's 30+ Weapons Grand Champion (Marlborough, MA)
 New England Open Karate Championship Women's 30+ Forms Grand Champion (Marlborough, MA)
 Twin Towers Karate Tournament Women's 30+ Weapons Grand Champion (New York, NY)

2010
In November 2010, Murphy competed in the 2nd World Karate & Kickboxing Council (WKC) World Championships in Albufeira, Portugal, earning a Silver Medal in Traditional Weapons, and two Bronze Medals in Traditional Weapons, and Women's Team Point Sparring.

Tournament Highlights:

2010 WKC World Championships (Albufeira, Portugal)
 Silver Medalist 18-34 Traditional Weapons
 Bronze Medalist 18-34 Traditional Hard Style Weapons
 Bronze Medalist Women's Team Point Sparring

2010 WKC Nationals (Detroit, Mi)
 Gold Medal Winner 18-34 Traditional Forms (US National Champion)
 Gold Medal Winner 18-34 Traditional Hard Style Weapons (US National Champion)

Karate Rating Association of New England (KRANE)
 2010 KRANE New York State Champion  30-39 Women's Traditional Forms
 2010 KRANE New York State Champion  30-39 Women's Traditional Weapons
 2010 KRANE Nationals Gold Medal Winner 30-39 Women's Traditional Forms (US National Champion)
 2010 KRANE Nationals Gold Medal Winner 30-39 Women's Traditional Weapons (US National Champion)
 2010 KRANE Triple Crown Winner 30-39 Women's Traditional Forms
 2010 KRANE Triple Crown Winner 30-39 Women's Traditional Weapons

Twin Towers Classic Tournament 
 2010 Twin Towers Karate Tournament Women's Forms Grand Champion (New York, NY)
 2010 Twin Towers Karate Tournament Women's Weapons Grand Champion (New York, NY)

2009
Karate Rating Association of New England (KRANE)
 2009  KRANE Nationals Gold Medal Winner 30-39 Women's Traditional Forms (US National Champion)
 2009  KRANE Nationals Gold Medal Winner 30-39 Women's Traditional Weapons (US National Champion)
 2009  KRANE New York State Champion  30-39 Women's Traditional Forms (New York State Champion)
 2009  KRANE New York State Champion  30-39 Women's Traditional Weapons (New York State Champion)
 2009  KRANE New York State Champion  30-39 Women's Point Sparring (New York State Champion)
 2009  KRANE Triple Crown Winner 30-39 Women's Traditional Weapons

2008
Karate Rating Association of New England (KRANE)
 2008  KRANE New York State Champion  18-29  Women's Traditional Forms (New York State Champion)
 2008  KRANE New York State Champion  18-29 Women's Traditional Weapons (New York State Champion)
 2008  KRANE New York State Champion  18-29 Women's Point Sparring (New York State Champion)
 2008  KRANE Nationals Bronze Medal Winner 18-29 Women's Traditional Forms
 2008  KRANE Nationals Bronze Medal Winner 18-29 Women's Traditional Weapons
 2008  Urban Cup Goju Karate Tournament Champion Black Belt Kata

2007
Karate Rating Association of New England (KRANE)
 2007 KRANE Nationals Bronze Medal Winner 18-29 Women's Traditional Forms
 2007 New York State Martial Arts Karate Championships Winner 18-29 Women's Point Sparring (New York State Champion)
 2007 Bushido Challenge Karate Tournament Gold Medal Winner Women's Forms
 2007 Bushido Challenge Karate Tournament Gold Medal Winner Women's Weapons
 2007 Northeast Open Tournament – 3rd place Adult Blackbelt Traditional Forms

References

1979 births
Living people
American female kickboxers
American female karateka
Sportspeople from New York (state)
Gōjū-ryū practitioners
21st-century American women